Louterwater is a town in Sarah Baartman District Municipality in the Eastern Cape province of South Africa, located between Joubertina and Misgund on the R62 road.

The town hosts a large apple and pear farm of the same name, which had been bought in 1961 by P. K. Le Roux, then Minister of Agriculture and Water Affairs; the farm is still owned by his descendants.

References

Populated places in the Kou-Kamma Local Municipality